The Irish Convention sat 7 February, 2 March and 27 May 1660, and again January 1661. It sought to restore the monarchy, episcopacy and also the right for the King's Irish Parliament to tax and legislate for itself, rejecting claims of legislative supremacy by the King's English Parliament.

Sir Charles Coote was a central figure in the Convention. In May 1660 the Convention asked the King of Ireland to "call a parliament consisting of Protestant peers and commons. It was also requested that the Church of Ireland should again be established"

The Convention Parliament was dissolved by Charles II in January 1661 and he summoned his parliament in Ireland in May 1661.

References

See also
Restoration (Ireland)

1660 in Ireland